Thomas Francis Chrostwaite (1873–1958, USA) established the Pennsylvania State Association of Boroughs in 1911. A native of Ashley Borough, Chrostwaite was an 1898 graduate of Harvard University and went on to serve as a school administrator for several years in Luzerne County, Pennsylvania.

Career 
In 1905, after graduation from Harvard, Chrostwaite was admitted to the Pennsylvania Bar and opened a law office in York County, where he dedicated his efforts as municipal solicitor for Hanover Borough. In this capacity, Chrostwaite became fascinated with community organization, municipal law, and the history of local governments.  His passion for these subjects led him to visit borough governments across Pennsylvania, where he would often converse with citizens that lived under various styles of municipal government to gain a more comprehensive perspective of the Commonwealth.  His personal enrichment also extended to his foreign travels, where Chrostwaite attempted to further develop his understanding of local governmental systems and their responsiveness to the citizens they serve.  His extensive experiences were instrumental in establishing the Pennsylvania State Association of Boroughs. Chrostwaite was editor of the Municipal Law Reporter.  Later he served as school administrator in Luzerne County, Pennsylvania.

Pennsylvania State Association of Boroughs 
In the early years, the Association advocated for health regulations to confront high incidences of disease, promoted infrastructure development which led to job creation and served a vital role in helping to shape state programs that were important to citizens.  Chrostwaite retired as President of PSAB in 1957 at the age of 84.  To memorialize his contributions, PSAB created the Chrostwaite Institute. He is also commemorated by the Thomas F. Chrostwaite Award.

References

External links
 Chrostwaite Institute

1873 births
Pennsylvania local politicians
Harvard University alumni
1958 deaths
People from Ashley, Pennsylvania
Pennsylvania lawyers